Republican China may refer to:

 The Republic of China on the mainland with distinctive periods:
 Beiyang government
 Nationalist government
 Wang Jingwei regime
 The Republic of China on Taiwan since 1949
 The free area of the Republic of China

See also
 Republic of China (disambiguation)